Alexander Lokhmanchuk (born 28 May 1973 in Kerch, Ukrainian SSR, Soviet Union) is a former professional basketball player of Ukraine men's national basketball team. The forward is 2.09 m tall.

International career
Lokhmanchuk was a regular Ukraine national basketball team player.

References

External links
Player profile
Profile at eurobasket.lt
Player profile at basketzone.com
Player profile at euroleague.net

1973 births
Living people
Bayer Giants Leverkusen players
BC Budivelnyk players
Fenerbahçe men's basketball players
Pallacanestro Varese players
Power forwards (basketball)
Skyliners Frankfurt players
SLUC Nancy Basket players
Ukrainian men's basketball players
Ukrainian expatriate basketball people in France
Ukrainian expatriate sportspeople in Germany
Ukrainian expatriate basketball people in Turkey
Ukrainian expatriate sportspeople in Italy
Tigers Tübingen players
Ukrainian men's basketball coaches
People from Kerch